David William Schultz (born October 14, 1949) is a Canadian businessman and former professional ice hockey coach and player. As a player, he was a two-time Stanley Cup winner with the Philadelphia Flyers.

Nicknamed "The Hammer", Schultz is renowned as one of hockey's best enforcers and holds the NHL record for most penalty minutes in a single season, at 472. Schultz was born in Waldheim, Saskatchewan, but grew up in Rosetown, Saskatchewan.

Playing career
Schultz was known as a point producer in junior hockey, but became an "enforcer" in his first year of pro hockey with the Salem Rebels of the EHL, prior to joining the Philadelphia Flyers, where he would become famous.

Schultz earned the nickname "The Hammer" for his aggressive style of hockey. He was one of the most notable enforcers on the Philadelphia Flyers' famous "Broad Street Bullies". After winning two Stanley Cups with the Flyers (1973–74 and 1974–75), "The Hammer" drifted through several teams (Pittsburgh Penguins, Los Angeles Kings and Buffalo Sabres) in search of a permanent position. When GMs tried to find some "muscle" for their fledgling clubs, they thought of him. Schultz was also able to capitalize on his popularity as a player when he recorded a local Philadelphia hit song called "The Penalty Box" in the mid 1970s.

Schultz could be more than an enforcer; he scored 20 goals for Philadelphia in 1973–74. He also scored the series-winning goal in overtime in the first round of the 1974 Stanley Cup playoffs against the Atlanta Flames. Despite his successes, Schultz later expressed regret about his role as an enforcer and the prominence of fighting in hockey.

After injuring his wrist in a fight, Schultz once put boxing wraps on his hands for protection. As things usually went, Schultz had several fights in ensuing games, while wearing the wraps. However, soon after, enforcers in both the National Hockey League and World Hockey Association started wearing similar hand protection. This was not to protect an already injured hand/wrist, but to protect themselves from injury in a fight. Soon after this trick became popular, both the WHA and NHL passed what became known as the "Schultz Rule" — thus banning the boxing wraps' temporary involvement in professional ice hockey.

Post-playing career
After retiring as a player Schultz coached several minor league teams over the next two decades including the Madison Monsters, Baton Rouge Kingfish, and most recently the Elmira Jackals.

Schultz co-authored a book entitled The Hammer with Stan Fischler that provides insights into the world of a professional ice hockey enforcer.

In 1994, he served as referee at WCW Slamboree for the match between The Nasty Boys against Cactus Jack & Kevin Sullivan.

In 2022, he voiced himself in The Simpsons episode Top Goon.

Awards
1974 - Stanley Cup Philadelphia Flyers
1975 - Stanley Cup Philadelphia Flyers
Inducted into Flyers Hall of Fame on November 16, 2009

Records
Holds the NHL record for most penalty minutes in a season with 472 penalty minutes during the 1974–75 season.

Career statistics

Playing career
Figures in boldface italics are NHL records.

Coaching record

Source:

Filmography

See also
List of NHL players with 2000 career penalty minutes
NHL career leaders, penalty minutes

References

External links
 
official website

1949 births
Buffalo Sabres players
Canadian ice hockey left wingers
Ice hockey people from Saskatchewan
Living people
Los Angeles Kings players
People from Rosetown
Philadelphia Flyers draft picks
Philadelphia Flyers players
Pittsburgh Penguins players
Quebec Aces (AHL) players
Richmond Robins players
Rochester Americans players
Salem Rebels (EHL) players
Stanley Cup champions
Canadian expatriate ice hockey people in the United States